MPCL Thermal Power Project is located near Angul in Odisha. The power plant is one of the coal based power plants of Monnet Power Company Limited.

Power Plant
The project is sponsored by Monnet Power Company Limited a subsidiary of Monnet Ispat and Energy Ltd and will use supercritical technology.

State-run power equipment maker BHEL has bagged an order worth Rs 5,600 crore for 1050-megawatts (MW) power plant from MPCL for this project on turnkey basis.

The project was funded by a consortium of 27 banks, who has disbursed 85 per cent of their sanctioned amount but due to a cost overrun in the project, the lenders were not keen to extend/enhance further credit to the company. But now the parent company MIEL has passed a board resolution to sell its stake in power arm.

Company is also planning another 660MW unit at the same site.

Installed Capacity

References

Coal-fired power stations in Odisha
Angul district
Year of establishment missing